Calathus rotundatus is a species of ground beetle from the Platyninae subfamily. It can be found in Portugal and Spain.

References

rotundatus
Beetles described in 1857
Beetles of Europe